The 2004 San Diego State Aztecs football team represented San Diego State University in the 2004 NCAA Division I-A football season.  They were coached by Tom Craft and played their home games at Qualcomm Stadium.

Schedule

References

San Diego State
San Diego State Aztecs football seasons
San Diego State Aztecs football